Cordieritidaceae is a family of fungi in the order Cyttariales. Species in this family are saprobes or lichenicolous.

Description
The ascomata of Cordieritidaceae species are apothecial, and range in shape from disc-shaped, cup-shaped, funnel-shaped, to ear-shaped. They are either sessile or stipitate, sometimes arising from a common base or from branched stipes with a dark stroma, and they are sometimes covered with hairs.

Genera
Ameghiniella  – 2 spp.
Amylogalla  – 1 sp.
Annabella  – 1 sp.
Austrocenangium  – 2 spp.
Cordierites  – 6 spp.
Diplocarpa  – 1 sp.
Diplolaeviopsis  – 3 spp.
Gelatinopsis  – 1 sp.
Ionomidotis  – 4 spp.
Llimoniella  – 21 spp.
Macroskyttea  – 1 sp.
Midotiopsis  – 2 spp.
Phaeangella  – 13 spp.
Rhizocladosporium  – 1 spp.
Rhymbocarpus  – 10 spp.
Sabahriopsis  – 1 sp.
Skyttea  – 36 spp.
Skyttella  – 2 spp.
Thamnogalla  – 1 sp.
Unguiculariopsis  – ca. 40 spp.
Unguiculella  – 15 spp.

References

Ascomycota families
Taxa described in 1889
Leotiomycetes